The 74th parallel south is a circle of latitude that is 74 degrees south of the Earth's equatorial plane in the Antarctic. The parallel passes through the Southern Ocean and Antarctica.

Around the world
Starting at the Prime Meridian and heading eastwards, the parallel 74° south passes through:

See also
73rd parallel south
75th parallel south

s74